Yūichirō Chikaraishi (June 30, 1876 - March 17, 1933) was a Japanese politician. He was governor of Nagano Prefecture (1914-1915), Ōita Prefecture (1915-1917),
Ibaraki Prefecture (1917-1921), Miyagi Prefecture (1921-1924), Akita Prefecture (1927-1928), Niigata Prefecture (1928) and Osaka Prefecture (1928-1929).

1876 births
1933 deaths
Governors of Nagano
Governors of Ōita
Governors of Ibaraki Prefecture
Governors of Miyagi Prefecture
Governors of Akita Prefecture
Governors of Niigata Prefecture
Governors of Osaka